Strawbridge is a surname. Notable people with the surname include:

George W. Strawbridge, Jr. (born 1937) American educator, historian, investor, sportsman, and philanthropist
Dick Strawbridge (born 1959), British engineer and television presenter
Robert Strawbridge (died 1781), Irish Methodist preacher
Charlotte Strawbridge,  British singer-songwriter
James Dale Strawbridge (1824–1890) American Republican member of the U.S. House of Representatives from Pennsylvania